Brau may refer to:

 Brau people, a Bahnaric people from Laos and Vietnam
 Brao language, spoken by Brau people
 Braone, an Italian commune also known as Braù in Camunian dialect
 Brau Holding International, German brewing corporation

People with the surname Brau:

 Edgar Brau,  Argentine writer, stage director and artist
James C. Brau (born 1968), American economist
 James E. Brau (born 1946), American physicist 
 Mariano Brau (born 1982), Argentine footballer
 Salvador Brau (1842 –1912),  Puerto Rican writer, historian, and sociologist

See also 
 Brou (disambiguation)